A Gabriel's horn (also called Torricelli's trumpet) is a type of geometric figure that has infinite surface area but finite volume. The name refers to the Christian tradition where the archangel Gabriel blows the horn to announce Judgment Day. The properties of this figure were first studied by Italian physicist and mathematician Evangelista Torricelli in the 17th century.

These colourful informal names and the allusion to religion came along later.
Torricelli's own name for it is to be found in the Latin title of his paper , written in 1643, a truncated acute hyperbolic solid, cut by a plane.
Volume 1, part 1 of his  published the following year included that paper and a second more orthodox (for the time) Archimedean proof of its theorem about the volume of a truncated acute hyperbolic solid.
This name was used in mathematical dictionaries of the 18th century (including "Hyperbolicum Acutum" in Harris' 1704 dictionary and in Stone's 1726 one, and the French translation  in d'Alembert's 1751 one.

Although credited with primacy by his contemporaries, Torricelli was not the first to describe an infinitely long shape with a finite volume or area.
The work of Nicole Oresme in the 14th century had either been forgotten by, or was unknown to them.
Oresme had posited such things as an infinitely long shape constructed by subdividing two squares of finite total area 2 using a geometric series and rearranging the parts into a figure, infinitely long in one dimension, comprising a series of rectangles.

Mathematical definition

Gabriel's horn is formed by taking the graph of

with the domain  and rotating it in three dimensions about the  axis. Using integration (see Solid of revolution and Surface of revolution for details), it is possible to find the volume  and the surface area :

Mathematically, the volume approaches  as  approaches infinity. Using the limit notation of calculus,

That means, in this case, that the horn has an infinite surface area. That is to say,

In  

Torricelli's original non-calculus proof used an object, slightly different to the aforegiven, that was constructed by truncating the acute hyperbolic solid with a plane perpendicular to the x axis and extending it from the opposite side of that plane with a cylinder of the same base.

In modern terminology this solid was created by constructing a surface of revolution of the function (for strictly positive )

 

and Torricelli's theorem was that its volume is the same as the volume of the right cylinder with height  and radius :

If , as in the modern calculus derivation, .)

In the  this is one of two proofs of the volume of the (truncated) acute hyperbolic solid.
Ironically, this was an echo of Archimedes' own caution in supplying two proofs, mechanical and geometrical, in his Quadrature of the Parabola to Dositheus.

Apparent paradox
When the properties of Gabriel's horn were discovered, the fact that the rotation of an infinitely large section of the  plane about the  axis generates an object of finite volume was considered a paradox. While the section lying in the  plane has an infinite area, any other section parallel to it has a finite area. Thus the volume, being calculated from the "weighted sum" of sections, is finite.

Another approach is to treat the solid as a stack of disks with diminishing radii. The sum of the radii produces a harmonic series that goes to infinity. However, the correct calculation is the sum of their squares. The series  diverges, but the series  converges. In general, for any real , the series  converges.

The apparent paradox formed part of a dispute over the nature of infinity involving many of the key thinkers of the time, including Thomas Hobbes, John Wallis, and Galileo Galilei.

There is a similar phenomenon that applies to lengths and areas in the plane.

In lecture 16 of his 1666 , Isaac Barrow held that Torricelli's theorem had constrained Aristotle's general dictum (from De Caelo book 1, part 6) that "there is no proportion between the finite and the infinite". Aristotle had himself, strictly speaking, been making a case for the impossibility of the physical existence of an infinite body rather than a case for its impossibility as a geometrical abstract.
Barrow had been adopting the contemporary 17th-century view that Aristotle's dictum and other geometrical axioms were (as he had said in lecture 7) from "some higher and universal science", underpinning both mathematics and physics.
Thus Torricelli's demonstration of an object with a relation between a finite (volume) and an infinite (area) contradicted this dictum, at least in part.
Barrow's explanation was that Aristotle's dictum still held, but only in a more limited fashion when comparing things of the same type, length with length, area with area, volume with volume, and so forth.
It did not hold when comparing things of two different genera (area with volume, for example) and thus an infinite area could be connected to a finite volume.

Others used Torricelli's theorem to bolster their own philosophical claims, unrelated to mathematics from a modern viewpoint.
Ignace-Gaston Pardies in 1671 used the acute hyperbolic solid to argue that finite humans could comprehend the infinite, and proceeded to offer it as proof of the existences of God and immaterial souls.
Since finite matter could not comprehend the infinite, Pardies argued, the fact that humans could comprehend this proof showed that humans must be more than matter, and have immaterial souls.
In contrast, Antoine Arnauld argued that because humans perceived a paradox here, human thought was limited in what it could comprehend, and thus is not up to the task of disproving divine, religious, truths.

Hobbes' and Wallis' dispute was actually within the realm of mathematics: Wallis enthusiastically embracing the new concepts of infinity and indivisibles, proceeding to make further conclusions based upon Torricelli's work and to extend it to employ arithmetic rather than Torricelli's geometric arguments; and Hobbes claiming that since mathematics is derived from real world perceptions of finite things, "infinite" in mathematics can only mean "indefinite".
These led to strongly worded letters by each to the Royal Society and in Philosophical Transactions, Hobbes resorting to namecalling Wallis "mad" at one point.
In 1672 Hobbes tried to re-cast Torricelli's theorem as about a finite solid that was extended indefinitely, in an attempt to hold on to his contention that "natural light" (i.e. common sense) told us that an infinitely long thing must have an infinite volume.
This aligned with Hobbes' other assertions that the use of the idea of a zero-width line in geometry was erroneous, and that Cavalieri's idea of indivisibles was ill-founded.
Wallis argued that there existed geometrical shapes with finite area/volume but no centre of gravity based upon Torricelli, stating that understanding this required more of a command of geometry and logic "than M. Hobs  is Master of".
He also restructured the arguments in arithmetical terms as the sums of arithmetic progressions, sequences of arithmetic infinitesimals rather than sequences of geometric indivisibles.

Oresme had already demonstrated that an infinitely long shape can have a finite area where, as one dimension tends towards infinitely large, another dimension tends towards infinitely small.
In Barrow's own words "the infinite diminution of one dimension compensates for the infinite increase of the other", in the case of the acute hyperbolic solid by the equation of the Apollonian hyperbola .

Painter's paradox
Since the horn has finite volume but infinite surface area, there is an apparent paradox that the horn could be filled with a finite quantity of paint and yet that paint would not be sufficient to coat its surface.
However, this paradox is again only an apparent paradox caused by an incomplete definition of "paint", or by using contradictory definitions of paint for the actions of filling and painting.

One could be postulating a "mathematical" paint that is infinitely divisible (or infinitely thinnable, or simply zero-width like the zero-width geometric lines that Hobbes took issue with) and capable of travelling at infinite speed, or a "physical" paint with the properties of paint in the real world.
With either one, the apparent paradox vanishes:

With "mathematical" paint, it does not follow in the first place that an infinite surface area requires an infinite volume of paint, as infinite surface area times zero-thickness paint is indeterminate.

With physical paint, painting the outside of the solid would require an infinite amount of paint because physical paint has a non-zero thickness. Torricelli's theorem does not talk about a layer of finite width on the outside of the solid, which in fact would have infinite volume. Thus there is no contradiction between infinite volume of paint and infinite surface area to cover. It is also impossible to paint the interior of the solid, the finite volume of Torricelli's theorem, with physical paint, so no contradiction exists. This is because physical paint can only fill an approximation of the volume of the solid. The molecules do not completely tile 3-dimensional space and leave gaps, and there is a point where the "throat" of the solid becomes too narrow for paint molecules to flow down.

Physical paint travels at a bounded speed and would take an infinite amount of time to flow down. This also applies to "mathematical" paint of zero thickness if one does not additionally postulate it flowing at infinite speed.

Other different postulates of "mathematical" paint, such as infinite-speed paint that gets thinner at a fast enough rate, remove the paradox too. For volume  of paint, as the surface area to be covered  tends towards infinity, the thickness of the paint  tends towards zero. Like with the solid itself, the infinite increase of the surface area to be painted in one dimension is compensated by the infinite decrease in another dimension, the thickness of the paint.

Converse

The converse of Torricelli's acute hyperbolic solid is a surface of revolution that has a finite surface area but an infinite volume.

In response to Torricelli's theorem, after learning of it from Marin Mersenne, Christiaan Huygens and René-François de Sluse wrote letters to each other about extending the theorem to other infinitely long solids of revolution; which have been mistakenly identified as finding such a converse.

Jan A. van Maanen, professor of mathematics at the University of Utrecht, reported in the 1990s that he once mis-stated in a conference at Kristiansand that de Sluse wrote to Huygens in 1658 that he had found such a shape:

to be told in response (by Tony Gardiner and Man-Keung Siu of the University of Hong Kong) that any surface of rotation with a finite surface area would of necessity have a finite volume.

Professor van Maanen realized that this was a misinterpretation of de Sluse's letter, and that what de Sluse was actually reporting that the solid "goblet" shape, formed by rotating the cissoid of Diocles and its asymptote about the y axis, had a finite volume (and hence "small weight") and enclosed a cavity of infinite volume.

Huygens first showed that the area of the rotated two-dimensional shape (between the cissoid and its asymptote) was finite, calculating its area to be 3 times the area of the generating circle of the cissoid, and de Sluse applied Pappus's centroid theorem to show that the solid of revolution thus has finite volume, being a product of that finite area and the finite orbit of rotation.
The area being rotated is finite; de Sluse did not actually say anything about the surface area of the resultant rotated volume.

Such a converse cannot occur (assuming Euclidean geometry) when revolving a continuous function on a closed set.

Theorem
Let  be a continuously differentiable function. Write  for the solid of revolution of the graph  about the  axis.

Proof

Since the lateral surface area  is finite, the limit superior:

Therefore, there exists a  such that the supremum } is finite. Hence,

must be finite, since  is a continuous function, which implies that  is bounded on the interval .
Finally, the volume:

Therefore: if the area  is finite, then the volume  must also be finite.

See also

References

Reference bibliography

Further reading

External links
Torricelli's trumpet at PlanetMath

 "Gabriel's Horn" by John Snyder, the Wolfram Demonstrations Project, 2007.
 Gabriel's Horn: An Understanding of a Solid with Finite Volume and Infinite Surface Area by Jean S. Joseph.

Mathematical paradoxes
Paradoxes of infinity
Calculus
Horn
Surfaces